| tries = {{#expr:

+ 6  + 9 + 5  + 7  + 6 + 3  + 6  + 4 + 10 + 11
+ 11 + 5 + 6  + 9  + 6 + 7  + 1  + 5 + 4  + 11
+ 6  + 5 + 10 + 8  + 5 + 7  + 3  + 9 + 6  + 5
+ 5  + 7 + 11 + 10 + 8 + 4  + 5  + 6 + 7  + 11
+ 4  + 6 + 7  + 8  + 6 + 4  + 11 + 4 + 0  + 4
+ 13 + 5 + 10 + 7  + 8 + 11 + 10 + 8 + 7  + 6
+ 7 + 7 + 8 + 0
+ 2 + 0
}}
| top point scorer = Dan Biggar (Ospreys)(78 points)
| top try scorer = Keelan Giles (Ospreys)(7 tries)
| venue               = Murrayfield Stadium, Edinburgh
| attendance2         = 
| champions           =  Stade Français
| count               = 
| runner-up           =  Gloucester
| website             = EPCR Website
| previous year       = 2015–16
| previous tournament = 2015–16 European Rugby Challenge Cup
| next year           = 2017–18
| next tournament     = 2017–18 European Rugby Challenge Cup
}}

The 2016–17 European Rugby Challenge Cup was the third edition of the European Rugby Challenge Cup, an annual second-tier rugby union competition for professional clubs. Clubs from six European nations plus one Russian club competed. It was also the 21st season of the Challenge Cup competition in all forms, following on from the now defunct European Challenge Cup.

Montpellier were the reigning champions, having beaten Harlequins in the final of the 2015–16 European Rugby Challenge Cup. They did not defend their title as they automatically qualified for the 2016–17 European Rugby Champions Cup as a result of the win.

The first round of the group stage began on the weekend of 13/14/15/16 October 2016, and the competition ended with the final on 12 May 2017 in Edinburgh.

Stade Français won the final 25–17 against Gloucester.

Teams
20 teams qualified for the 2016–17 European Rugby Challenge Cup; a total of 18 qualified from across the Premiership, Pro12 and Top 14, as a direct result of their domestic league performance, with two coming through a play-off. The expected distribution of teams was:
 England: 6
 Any teams finishing between 7th-11th position in the Aviva Premiership. (5 Teams)
 The champion of the Greene King IPA Championship. (1 Team)
 France: 7
 Any teams finishing between 8th-12th position in the Top 14. (5 Teams)
 The champion, and the winner of the promotion play-off, from the Pro D2. (2 Teams)
 Ireland, Italy, Scotland & Wales: 5 teams
 Any teams that did not qualify for the European Rugby Champions Cup, through the Guinness Pro12 — namely the Pro12 bottom 5. (5 teams)

The French Top 14 had its allocation reduced by 1 place after Montpellier won the 2015–16 European Rugby Challenge Cup. This is after it was decided that, due to the 2015 Rugby World Cup, there would be no qualification play-off.

 Other European Nations: 2 teams
 Two teams qualified through the 2015–16 Qualifying Competition, which took place alongside the Challenge Cup and Champions Cup competitions.

The following clubs qualified for the Challenge Cup.

Qualifying competition

Once again, EPCR expanded the qualifying competition.

Eight teams were split into two pools of four. Each team played the four teams in the other pool once. The winner of each pool then played a two-legged final against last year's qualifying sides, and the winners, on aggregate, took the two remaining places in the Challenge Cup.

Pool A play-off

Enisey-STM qualify with an aggregate score of 70–5

Pool B play-off

Timișoara Saracens qualify with an aggregate score of 64–40

Team details
Below is the list of coaches, captain and stadiums with their method of qualification for each team.

Note: Placing shown in brackets, denotes standing at the end of the regular season for their respective leagues, with their end of season positioning shown through CH for Champions, RU for Runner-up, SF for losing Semi-finalist and QF for losing Quarter-finalist.

Seeding
The 20 competing teams were seeded and split into four tiers; seeding was based on performance in their respective domestic leagues. Where promotion and relegation is in effect in a league, the promoted team was seeded last, or (if multiple teams are promoted) by performance in the lower tier.

Teams were taken from a league in order of rank and put into a tier. A draw was used to allocate two second seeds to Tier 1; the remaining team went into Tier 2. This allocation indirectly determined which fourth-seeded team entered Tier 2, while the others entered Tier 3.

Given the nature of the Qualifying Competition, a competition including developing rugby nations and Italian clubs not competing in the Pro12, Rugby Europe 1 and Rugby Europe 2 were automatically included in Tier 4, despite officially being ranked 1/2 from that competition.

The brackets show each team's seeding and their league (for example, 1 Top 14 indicates the team was seeded 1st from the Top 14).

The following restrictions applied to the draw:
 The 5 pools each contain four clubs, one from each of the 4 Tiers.
 Each pool is required to have one club from each league, drawn from Tier 1, 2 or 3. A second team will only be added to a pool during the Tier 4 allocation.

Pool stage

The draw took place on 29 June 2016, in Neuchâtel, Switzerland.

Teams played each other twice, both at home and away, in the group stage, that began on weekend of 13/14/15/16 October 2016, and continued through to 19/20/21/22 January 2017, before the pool winners and three best runners-up progressed to the quarter finals.

Teams were awarded competition points, based on match result. Teams received 4 points for a win, 2 points for a draw, 1 attacking bonus point for scoring four or more tries in a match and 1 defensive bonus point for losing a match by seven points or fewer.

In the event of a tie between two or more teams, the following tie-breakers were used, as directed by EPCR:
 Where teams have played each other
 The club with the greater number of competition points from only matches involving tied teams.
 If equal, the club with the best aggregate points difference from those matches.
 If equal, the club that scored the most tries in those matches.
 Where teams remain tied and/or have not played each other in the competition (i.e. are from different pools)
 The club with the best aggregate points difference from the pool stage.
 If equal, the club that scored the most tries in the pool stage.
 If equal, the club with the fewest players suspended in the pool stage.
 If equal, the drawing of lots will determine a club's ranking.

Pool 1

Pool 2

Pool 3

Pool 4

Pool 5

Pool winners and runners-up rankings

Knock-out stage

Format
The eight qualifiers were ranked according to performance in the pool stages, and compete in the quarter-finals, which was held on the weekend of 30/31 March, 1/2 April 2017. The top four teams hosted the quarter-finals against the lower teams in a 1v8, 2v7, 3v6 and 4v5 format.

The semi-finals were played on the weekend of 21/22/23 April 2017. In lieu of the draw that used to determine the semi-final pairing, EPCR announced that a fixed semi-final bracket would be set in advance, and that home advantage would be awarded to a side based on "performances by clubs during the pool stages as well as the achievement of a winning a quarter-final match away from home".

Home advantage was awarded as follows:

The winners of the semi-finals contested the final at Murrayfield on 12 May 2017.

Bracket

Quarter-finals

Semi-finals

Final

Attendances
Does not include final as this is held at a neutral venue.

See also
2016–17 European Rugby Champions Cup

Notes

References

 
2016-17
2016–17 rugby union tournaments for clubs
2016–17 in European rugby union
2016–17 in English rugby union
2016–17 in French rugby union
2016–17 in Romanian rugby union
2016–17 in Italian rugby union
2016–17 in Scottish rugby union
2016–17 in Welsh rugby union
2017 in Russian rugby union
2016 in Russian rugby union